Eunice Cho (born December 15, 1991 in New Jersey) is an American actress and scientist.  Her best-known role was Robin in the Cartoon Network live-action/animated TV movie, Re-Animated. She also voiced Kiku in Little Bill on Nickelodeon.

Cho obtained a Ph.D. degree in pharmacology from Yale University, where she studied regulation of oncogenic mitogen-activated protein kinase signaling. Her Erdős-Bacon number is 5.

Filmography
Little Bill (1999–2004) - Kiku (voice)
The Naked Brothers Band: The Movie (2005) - Hoola Hooper
Re-Animated (2006) - Robin
Ice Age: Dawn of the Dinosaurs (2009) - Madison (voice)

References

External links

1991 births
American child actresses
Living people
Actresses from New Jersey
American actresses of Korean descent
21st-century American actresses
American television actresses
Orange County School of the Arts alumni